Battle of Jaffna may refer to battles of the Sri Lankan Civil War:

Battle of Jaffna (1995)
Battle of Jaffna (2006)